"O Holy Night" is a well-known sacred song for Christmas performance. Originally based on a French-language poem by poet Placide Cappeau, written in 1843, with the first line  (Midnight, Christian, is the solemn hour) that composer Adolphe Adam set to music in 1847. The English version (with small changes to the initial melody) is by John Sullivan Dwight. The carol reflects on the birth of Jesus as humanity's redemption.

History
In Roquemaure in France at the end of 1843, the church organ had recently been renovated. To celebrate the event, the parish priest persuaded poet Placide Cappeau, a native of the town, to write a Christmas poem. Soon afterwards, in that same year, Adolphe Adam composed the music. The song was premiered in Roquemaure in 1847 by the opera singer Emily Laurey.

Transcendentalist, music critic, minister, and editor of Dwight's Journal of Music, John Dwight, adapted the song into English in 1855. This version became popular in the United States, especially in the North, where the third verse (including "Chains shall he break, for the slave is our brother, And in his name all oppression shall cease") resonated with abolitionists.

The wide vocal range of the song makes it one of the more difficult Christmas songs to execute properly. In French-language churches, it is commonly used at the beginning of the Midnight Mass.

On record charts
The song has been recorded by numerous well-known popular-music, classical-music, and religious-music singers. It makes a frequent appearance in the annual performances of the Choir of King's College, Cambridge. Several renditions by popular artists have appeared on record charts:

1971: Tommy Drennan and the Monarchs reached Christmas  in the Official Irish Singles Chart 
1994: Mariah Carey, from her first studio holiday album, Merry Christmas, reached  on the US Billboard Holiday 100 chart. It was re-released as a single in 1996 and 2000; a re-recorded live rendition is included on her 2010 follow-up album Merry Christmas II You. In 2019, her single was certified Gold in the US by RIAA. It reached  in Italy and it was certified Gold. It reached the top-twenty in Iceland, peaking at number 19.
1996: John Berry  on the Billboard Hot Country Songs chart
1998: Celine Dion  on Billboard'''s Holiday chart; in 2014, Nielsen SoundScan reported that her version had sold 240,000 copies in the US.
2002: Josh Groban  Billboard Adult Contemporary chart
2006: Josh Gracin  on Hot Country Songs chart
2010–2011: Glee cast  US Billboard Holiday Digital Song Sales chart
2012: Ladywell Primary School in Motherwell, Scotland, released "O Holy Night" as a digital download on November 21, 2012. The school donated 90 percent of proceeds from the song to the Meningitis Research Foundation in memory of a student who had died of meningococcal septicaemia. The remaining 10 percent went to school funds. It reached  on the UK Singles Chart.
2017–2018: Lauren Daigle  US Billboard'' Christian adult contemporary,  US Hot Christian Songs, and  US Christian Airplay charts

See also
 List of Christmas carols

References

External links

 
 
 Free sheet music for voice and piano, Cantorion.org
 Sheet music and musical details, artsongcentral.com
 ,  (original French version)

Compositions by Adolphe Adam
1847 songs
1847 compositions
19th-century hymns
French Christian hymns
Songs based on poems
Christmas carols
French-language Christmas carols
Songs about Jesus
2012 singles